Space Impact is a mobile game series that was published by Nokia and its games usually came bundled with several Nokia devices.

The first Space Impact appeared on the Nokia 3310 in 2000 and later included in other models released throughout 2001-2004, including Nokia 3410, 5510, Nokia 5210, Nokia 2100 and 6310. The Nokia 3310's WAP enhanced versions (3330 and 3350) and the Nokia 3410 versions gave the possibility to download extra Space Impact chapters via the phone's WAP connection (the service called Nokia Club).

A Space Impact-themed Xpress-on cover was released for devices including Nokia 3410.

Gameplay
Space Impact is a shoot 'em up game and the player has the ability to freely move horizontally and vertically (with a few exceptions on some platform-like levels in Space Impact+) but cannot increase the speed of the screen's auto-scrolling feature. The player can collect power-ups throughout the levels, which award extra lives or special weapons.

Series
Sequels for the original game later appeared:
Space Impact II, which debuted on Nokia 3510 and later appeared in Nokia's CDMA models - Identical gameplay to the original, with new levels and enemies
Space Impact+ included in Nokia 1100 and Nokia 2300 - Features platform-style levels
Space Impact 303, available as a downloadable J2ME app for certain devices, starting with Nokia 7210 - redesigned gameplay layout for color screen.
Space Impact Evolution, specifically made for the Symbian S60 1st Edition platform, which first appeared on Nokia 7650
Space Impact Evolution X, the sequel, which had two versions: one bundled exclusively with the N-Gage Classic and the N-Gage QD (on the "Extras" folder of the Support CD) and another made for Symbian S60 2nd Edition devices.
Space Impact Light, released for Symbian S60 3rd Edition. Its demo came bundled with the Nokia N81 8GB released in October 2007.
Space Impact: Kappa Base, released on the N-Gage 2.0 platform in 2008.
Space Impact: Meteor Shield, developed by Rovio and released first for Nokia N97 in 2010, and the first game in the series to feature 3D graphics.

More recently, various clones and remakes of the game have been made for the PC and platforms like iOS, WatchOS or Android, many of which offers an accurate emulation of the original game.

Reception
The original Space Impact is well remembered as one of the games of the popular Nokia 3310 handset. In 2010, CNET put it in its top 10 'greatest mobile games of all time', and said that it pushed the boundaries in what was possible on a mobile device.

See also

Snake
Bounce
N-Gage

References 

Nokia games
Mobile games
Video games developed in Finland
Video game franchises introduced in 2000
N-Gage games
N-Gage service games
Java platform games
Shoot 'em ups
Video games set in outer space
Symbian games
J2ME games
Video game franchises